The Vasai Road–Roha line of the Mumbai Suburban Railway is a public transit system. It connects Northern suburbs of Mumbai with Navi Mumbai and Roha on Konkan Railway. The Vasai Road–Roha line connects the Western line station of Vasai Road with the Central line station of Roha which last station before Konkan Railway starts. It intersects the main line of the Central line at Diva. The MEMUs operate between Dahanu Road and Panvel/Roha. It consists of 23 stations from Vasai Road railway station in north to Roha in south.

Stations

See also

 Mumbai Suburban Railway
 Western Railway
 List of Mumbai Suburban Railway stations
 Central Railway

References

Rail transport in Mumbai
Transport in Thane
Mumbai Suburban Railway lines
Transport in Navi Mumbai
Transport in Vasai-Virar